William Francis MacWilliams (23 July 1860–18 January 1931) was a New Zealand goldminer, businessman, bailiff and sportsman. He was born in Papakura, Auckland, New Zealand on 23 July 1860.

References

1860 births
1931 deaths
New Zealand businesspeople
New Zealand sportsmen
New Zealand miners
People from Papakura